Colegio Sagrados Corazones (Sacred Hearts School) was a Catholic day school in the municipality of Guaynabo in the metropolitan area of Puerto Rico. It offered PK-12 with a traditional educational approach and offered courses in the Spanish language. SSCC (as commonly abbreviated) was aimed at the Catholic denomination and offered a level of preschool and elementary in their academic program. The school was founded in 1964 and due to financial difficulties was permanently closed in 2019.

References

External links 
 

1964 establishments in Puerto Rico
Educational institutions established in 1964
Catholic secondary schools in Puerto Rico
Guaynabo, Puerto Rico